The 2008–09 Miami Heat season was the 21st season of the franchise in the National Basketball Association (NBA).

Following a disastrous 15-67 season, Pat Riley resigned as head coach, and assistant coach Erik Spoelstra was promoted to become the new head coach; he was the youngest NBA head coach at the time of his hiring. With a healthy Dwyane Wade back in the lineup, the Heat greatly improved on their regular season record and returned to the playoffs, but were eliminated in the first round to the Atlanta Hawks in seven games, all of which were decided by double-digit margins.

Key dates
 June 26: The 2008 NBA draft took place in New York City.
 July 1: The free agency period started.
 October 5: The pre-season started with a game against the Detroit Pistons.
 October 29: The regular season started with a game against the New York Knicks.

Draft picks

Roster

Regular season

Standings

Game log

|- bgcolor="#ffcccc"
| 1
| October 29
| @ New York
| L 115–120
| Dwyane Wade (26)
| Shawn Marion (11)
| Dwyane Wade (9)
| Madison Square Garden19,763
| 0–1
|- bgcolor="#ccffcc"
| 2
| October 31
| Sacramento
| W 103–77
| Dwyane Wade (20)
| Shawn Marion (10)
| Dwyane Wade (8)
| American Airlines Arena19,600
| 1–1

|- bgcolor="#ffcccc"
| 3
| November 1
| @ Charlotte
| L 87–100
| Michael Beasley (25)
| Shawn Marion (8)
| Mario Chalmers (8)
| Time Warner Cable Arena19,238
| 1–2
|- bgcolor="#ccffcc"
| 4
| November 5
| Philadelphia
| W 106–83
| Dwyane Wade (29)
| Michael Beasley (9)
| Wade, Chalmers (6)
| American Airlines Arena15,103
| 2–2
|- bgcolor="#ccffcc"
| 5
| November 7
| @ San Antonio
| W 99–83
| Dwyane Wade (33)
| Wade, Haslem (10)
| Dwyane Wade (9)
| AT&T Center17,387
| 3–2
|- bgcolor="#ffcccc"
| 6
| November 8
| @ New Orleans
| L 89–100
| Dwyane Wade (30)
| Shawn Marion (8)
| Dwyane Wade (10)
| New Orleans Arena17,701
| 3–3
|- bgcolor="#ccffcc"
| 7
| November 10
| New Jersey
| W 99–94
| Dwyane Wade (33)
| Udonis Haslem (8)
| Dwyane Wade (5)
| American Airlines Arena15,028
| 4–3
|- bgcolor="#ffcccc"
| 8
| November 12
| Portland
| L 96–104
| Dwyane Wade (36)
| Udonis Haslem (11)
| Dwyane Wade (8)
| American Airlines Arena15,021
| 4–4
|- bgcolor="#ccffcc"
| 9
| November 14
| Washington
| W 97–77
| Dwyane Wade (24)
| Udonis Haslem (13)
| Mario Chalmers (7)
| American Airlines Arena15,284
| 5–4
|- bgcolor="#ffcccc"
| 10
| November 16
| @ Toronto
| L 96–107
| Dwyane Wade (29)
| Udonis Haslem (10)
| Dwyane Wade (8)
| Air Canada Centre19,800
| 5–5
|- bgcolor="#ccffcc"
| 11
| November 18
| @ Washington
| W 94–87
| Dwyane Wade (19)
| Udonis Haslem (11)
| Dwyane Wade (10)
| Verizon Center15,102
| 6–5
|- bgcolor="#ffcccc"
| 12
| November 19
| Toronto
| L 95–101
| Dwyane Wade (40)
| Shawn Marion (14)
| Dwyane Wade (11)
| American Airlines Arena15,014
| 6–6
|- bgcolor="#ccffcc"
| 13
| November 22
| Indiana
| W 109–100
| Dwyane Wade (38)
| Shawn Marion (9)
| Dwyane Wade (8)
| American Airlines Arena18,685
| 7–6
|- bgcolor="#ffcccc"
| 14
| November 24
| Houston
| L 98–107
| Wade, Chalmers (23)
| Joel Anthony (8)
| Mario Chalmers (6)
| American Airlines Arena18,704
| 7–7
|- bgcolor="#ffcccc"
| 15
| November 26
| @ Portland
| L 68–106
| Michael Beasley (14)
| Wade, Haslem (6)
| Dwyane Wade (6)
| Rose Garden20,528
| 7–8
|- bgcolor="#ccffcc"
| 16
| November 28
| @ Phoenix
| W 107–92
| Dwyane Wade (43)
| Udonis Haslem (11)
| Wade, Marion (6)
| US Airways Center18,422
| 8–8
|- bgcolor="#ffcccc"
| 17
| November 29
| @ L.A. Clippers
| L 96–97
| Dwyane Wade (26)
| Shawn Marion (9)
| Dwyane Wade (11)
| Staples Center16,245
| 8–9

|- bgcolor="#ccffcc"
| 18
| December 1
| @ Golden State
| W 130–129 (OT)
| Dwyane Wade (37)
| Shawn Marion (15)
| Dwyane Wade (13)
| Oracle Arena18,723
| 9–9
|- bgcolor="#ccffcc"
| 19
| December 3
| @ Utah
| W 93–89
| Dwyane Wade (23)
| Udonis Haslem (13)
| Chris Quinn (6)
| EnergySolutions Arena19,911
| 10–9
|- bgcolor="#ccffcc"
| 20
| December 6
| Oklahoma City
| W 105–99
| Dwyane Wade (38)
| Udonis Haslem (14)
| Dwyane Wade (7)
| American Airlines Arena17,585
| 11–9
|- bgcolor="#ccffcc"
| 21
| December 8
| Charlotte
| 
| Dwyane Wade (41)
| Udonis Haslem (9)
| Wade, Chalmers (3)
| American Airlines Arena15,024
| 12–9
|- bgcolor="#ffcccc"
| 22
| December 12
| Atlanta
| 
| Dwyane Wade (21)
| Wade, Haslem (8)
| Quinn, Wade (3)
| American Airlines Arena19,600
| 12–10
|- bgcolor="#ffcccc"
| 23
| December 14
| @ Memphis
| 
| Michael Beasley (20)
| Marion, Anthony (13)
| Dwyane Wade (5)
| FedExForum12,271
| 12–11
|- bgcolor="#ffcccc"
| 24
| December 15
| Milwaukee
| 
| Mario Chalmers (20)
| Mario Chalmers (7)
| Chalmers, Wade (8)
| American Airlines Arena15,029
| 12–12
|- bgcolor="#ccffcc"
| 25
| December 19
| L.A. Lakers
| 
| Dwyane Wade (35)
| Shawn Marion (11)
| Mario Chalmers (4)
| American Airlines Arena19,600
| 13–12
|- bgcolor="#ccffcc"
| 26
| December 20
| @ New Jersey
| 
| Dwyane Wade (43)
| Haslem, Anthony (7)
| Mario Chalmers (7)
| Izod Center14,139
| 14–12
|- bgcolor="#ccffcc"
| 27
| December 23
| Golden State
| 
| Dwyane Wade (32)
| Shawn Marion (16)
| Dwyane Wade (8)
| American Airlines Arena17,862
| 15–12
|- bgcolor="#ccffcc"
| 28
| December 26
| Chicago
| 
| Dwyane Wade (28)
| Udonis Haslem (14)
| Mario Chalmers (6)
| American Airlines Arena19,600
| 16–12
|- bgcolor="#ffcccc"
| 29
| December 28
| @ Cleveland
| 
| Dwyane Wade (29)
| Shawn Marion (10)
| Dwyane Wade (8)
| Quicken Loans Arena20,562
| 16–13
|- bgcolor="#ccffcc"
| 30
| December 30
| Cleveland
| 
| Wade, Chalmers (21)
| Shawn Marion (11)
| Dwyane Wade (12)
| American Airlines Arena19,600
| 17–13

|- bgcolor="#ffcccc"
| 31
| January 2
| @ Orlando
| 
| Dwyane Wade (33)
| Haslem, Marion (8)
| Dwyane Wade (6)
| Amway Arena17,461
| 17–14
|- bgcolor="#ccffcc"
| 32
| January 3
| New Jersey
| 
| Dwyane Wade (29)
| Udonis Haslem (13)
| Dwyane Wade (6)
| American Airlines Arena19,600
| 18–14
|- bgcolor="#ffcccc"
| 33
| January 5
| San Antonio
| 
| Dwyane Wade (24)
| Michael Beasley (12)
| Dwyane Wade (12)
| American Airlines Arena19,600
| 18–15
|- bgcolor="#ffcccc"
| 34
| January 7
| @ Denver
| 
| Dwyane Wade (31)
| Shawn Marion (13)
| Mario Chalmers (7)
| Pepsi Center15,459
| 18–16
|- bgcolor="#ccffcc"
| 35
| January 9
| @ Sacramento
| 
| Dwyane Wade (41)
| Michael Beasley (10)
| Dwyane Wade (7)
| ARCO Arena12,587
| 19–16
|- bgcolor="#ffcccc"
| 36
| January 11
| @ L.A. Lakers
| 
| Dwyane Wade (27)
| Shawn Marion (8)
| Dwyane Wade (9)
| Staples Center18,997
| 19–17
|- bgcolor="#ccffcc"
| 37
| January 13
| @ Minnesota
| 
| Dwyane Wade (31)
| Shawn Marion (11)
| Dwyane Wade (8)
| Target Center10,856
| 20–17
|- bgcolor="#ccffcc"
| 38
| January 14
| @ Milwaukee
| 
| Daequan Cook (24)
| Shawn Marion (10)
| Dwyane Wade (13)
| Bradley Center15,271
| 21–17
|- bgcolor="#ffcccc"
| 39
| January 17
| @ Houston
| 
| Dwyane Wade (29)
| Shawn Marion (10)
| Dwyane Wade (9)
| Toyota Center18,369
| 21–18
|- bgcolor="#ccffcc"
| 40
| January 18
| @ Oklahoma City
| 
| Dwyane Wade (32)
| Udonis Haslem (15)
| Dwyane Wade (10)
| Ford Center19,136
| 22–18
|- bgcolor="#ffcccc"
| 41
| January 21
| Boston
| 
| Dwyane Wade (25)
| Michael Beasley (11)
| Mario Chalmers (7)
| American Airlines Arena19,600
| 22–19
|- bgcolor="#ccffcc"
| 42
| January 24
| Orlando
| 
| Dwyane Wade (27)
| Dwyane Wade (8)
| Wade, Chalmers (6)
| American Airlines Arena19,600
| 23–19
|- bgcolor="#ccffcc"
| 43
| January 26
| Atlanta
| 
| Dwyane Wade (35)
| Udonis Haslem (13)
| Mario Chalmers (6)
| American Airlines Arena18,103
| 24–19
|- bgcolor="#ccffcc"
| 44
| January 28
| Washington
| 
| Beasley, Cook (16)
| Anthony, Wade (9)
| Dwyane Wade (9)
| American Airlines Arena16,424
| 25–19
|- bgcolor="#ffcccc"
| 45
| January 30
| @ Indiana
| 
| Dwyane Wade (24)
| Michael Beasley (11)
| Quinn, Chalmers (5)
| Conseco Fieldhouse14,031
| 25–20
|- bgcolor="#ffcccc"
| 46
| January 31
| Dallas
| 
| Dwyane Wade (30)
| Michael Beasley (10)
| Chris Quinn (4)
| American Airlines Arena19,600
| 25–21

|- bgcolor="#ccffcc"
| 47
| February 2
| L.A. Clippers
| 
| Dwyane Wade (32)
| Beasley, Haslem, Marion, Anthony (7)
| Dwyane Wade (9)
| American Airlines Arena15,985
| 26–21
|- bgcolor="#ffcccc"
| 48
| February 4
| @ Detroit
| 
| Dwyane Wade (29)
| Udonis Haslem (10)
| Dwyane Wade (13)
| The Palace of Auburn Hills21,720
| 26–22
|- bgcolor="#ffcccc"
| 49
| February 7
| @ Philadelphia
| 
| Dwyane Wade (21)
| Udonis Haslem (9)
| Wade, Chalmers (7)
| Wachovia Center17,216
| 26–23
|- bgcolor="#ccffcc"
| 50
| February 8
| Charlotte
| 
| Dwyane Wade (22)
| Shawn Marion (10)
| Mario Chalmers (13)
| American Airlines Arena17,656
| 27–23
|- bgcolor="#ffcccc"
| 51
| February 10
| Denver
| 
| Dwyane Wade (33)
| Wade, Chalmers (7)
| Mario Chalmers (5)
| American Airlines Arena16,784
| 27–24
|- bgcolor="#ccffcc"
| 52
| February 12
| @ Chicago
| 
| Dwyane Wade (24)
| Marion, Haslem, Beasley (7)
| Dwyane Wade (7)
| United Center21,801
| 28–24
|- style="text-align:center;"
| colspan="9" style="background:#bbcaff;"|All-Star Break
|- bgcolor="#ffcccc"
| 53
| February 18
| Minnesota
| 
| Dwyane Wade (37)
| Udonis Haslem (6)
| Dwyane Wade (12)
| American Airlines Arena17,525
| 28–25
|- bgcolor="#ccffcc"
| 54
| February 21
| Philadelphia
| 
| Dwyane Wade (25)
| O'Neal, Haslem (10)
| Dwyane Wade (9)
| American Airlines Arena19,600
| 29–25
|- bgcolor="#ffcccc"
| 55
| February 22
| @ Orlando
| 
| Dwyane Wade (50)
| Udonis Haslem (8)
| Dwyane Wade (5)
| Amway Arena17,461
| 29–26
|- bgcolor="#ccffcc"
| 56
| February 24
| Detroit
| 
| Dwyane Wade (31)
| Udonis Haslem (11)
| Dwyane Wade (16)
| American Airlines Arena19,600
| 30–26
|- bgcolor="#ffcccc"
| 57
| February 27
| @ Atlanta
| 
| Michael Beasley (23)
| Haslem, O'Neal (11)
| Dwyane Wade (10)
| Philips Arena19,157
| 30–27
|- bgcolor="#ccffcc"
| 58
| February 28
| New York
| 
| Dwyane Wade (46)
| Jamario Moon (12)
| Dwyane Wade (10)
| American Airlines Arena19,600
| 31–27

|- bgcolor="#ffcccc"
| 59
| March 2
| Cleveland
| 
| Dwyane Wade (41)
| Udonis Haslem (9)
| Dwyane Wade (9)
| American Airlines Arena19,600
| 31–28
|- bgcolor="#ccffcc"
| 60
| March 4
| Phoenix
| 
| Dwyane Wade (35)
| Michael Beasley (9)
| Dwyane Wade (16)
| American Airlines Arena19,600
| 32–28
|- bgcolor="#ccffcc"
| 61
| March 6
| @ Toronto
| 
| Dwyane Wade (42)
| Jermaine O'Neal (8)
| Dwyane Wade (8)
| Air Canada Centre19,800
| 33–28
|- bgcolor="#ffcccc"
| 62
| March 7
| @ Cleveland
| 
| Dwyane Wade (25)
| Dwyane Wade (8)
| Dwyane Wade (12)
| Quicken Loans Arena20,562
| 33–29
|- bgcolor="#ccffcc"
| 63
| March 9
| Chicago
| 
| Dwyane Wade (48)
| Udonis Haslem (8)
| Dwyane Wade (12)
| American Airlines Arena19,600
| 34–29
|- bgcolor="#ccffcc"
| 64
| March 11
| Boston
| 
| Dwyane Wade (32)
| Jamario Moon (8)
| Wade, Chalmers (7)
| American Airlines Arena19,600
| 35–29
|- bgcolor="#ccffcc"
| 65
| March 14
| Utah
| 
| Dwyane Wade (50)
| Udonis Haslem (12)
| Dwyane Wade (9)
| American Airlines Arena19,600
| 36–29
|- bgcolor="#ffcccc"
| 66
| March 15
| @ Philadelphia
| 
| Jermaine O'Neal (20)
| Udonis Haslem (11)
| Jamario Moon (6)
| Wachovia Center20,100
| 36–30
|- bgcolor="#ffcccc"
| 67
| March 18
| @ Boston
| 
| Michael Beasley (21)
| Michael Beasley (7)
| Mario Chalmers (9)
| TD Banknorth Garden18,624
| 36–31
|- bgcolor="#ffcccc"
| 68
| March 20
| @ New Jersey
| 
| Dwyane Wade (27)
| Wade, Haslem (8)
| Dwyane Wade (6)
| Izod Center18,108
| 36–32
|- bgcolor="#ccffcc"
| 69
| March 22
| @ Detroit
| 
| Dwyane Wade (39)
| Moon, Haslem (6)
| Mario Chalmers (7)
| The Palace of Auburn Hills22,076
| 37–32
|- bgcolor="#ccffcc"
| 70
| March 23
| Memphis
| 
| Dwyane Wade (27)
| Jamaal Magloire (12)
| Dwyane Wade (8)
| American Airlines Arena18,654
| 38–32
|- bgcolor="#ffcccc"
| 71
| March 25
| @ Indiana
| 
| Dwyane Wade (21)
| Udonis Haslem (14)
| Dwyane Wade (8)
| Conseco Fieldhouse17,117
| 38–33
|- bgcolor="#ffcccc"
| 72
| March 26
| @ Chicago
| 
| Dwyane Wade (31)
| Udonis Haslem (6)
| Head, Chalmers (5)
| United Center21,908
| 38–34
|- bgcolor="#ccffcc"
| 73
| March 28
| Milwaukee
| 
| Dwyane Wade (27)
| Udonis Haslem (12)
| Dwyane Wade (7)
| American Airlines Arena18,108
| 39–34
|- bgcolor="#ffcccc"
| 74
| March 30
| Orlando
| 
| Dwyane Wade (42)
| Jamaal Magloire (8)
| Mario Chalmers (7)
| American Airlines Arena19,600
| 39–35

|- bgcolor="#ffcccc"
| 75
| April 1
| @ Dallas
| 
| Dwyane Wade (23)
| O'Neal, Haslem (7)
| Dwyane Wade (6)
| American Airlines Center20,021
| 39–36
|- bgcolor="#ccffcc"
| 76
| April 3
| @ Charlotte
| 
| Dwyane Wade (27)
| Daequan Cook (7)
| Dwyane Wade (10)
| Time Warner Cable Arena19,568
| 40–36
|- bgcolor="#ccffcc"
| 77
| April 4
| @ Washington
| 
| Dwyane Wade (33)
| O'Neal, Magloire (6)
| Dwyane Wade (8)
| Verizon Center20,173
| 41–36
|- bgcolor="#ffcccc"
| 78
| April 7
| New Orleans
| 
| Dwyane Wade (32)
| Jamaal Magloire (10)
| Dwyane Wade (6)
| American Airlines Arena19,600
| 41–37
|- bgcolor="#ffcccc"
| 79
| April 10
| @ Boston
| 
| Dwyane Wade (31)
| Michael Beasley (13)
| Dwyane Wade (9)
| TD Banknorth Garden18,624
| 41–38
|- bgcolor="#ccffcc"
| 80
| April 12
| New York
| 
| Dwyane Wade (55)
| Michael Beasley (16)
| Mario Chalmers (9)
| American Airlines Arena19,600
| 42–38
|- bgcolor="#ffcccc"
| 81
| April 14
| @ Atlanta
| 
| Michael Beasley (23)
| Michael Beasley (13)
| Chris Quinn (7)
| Philips Arena18,179
| 42–39
|- bgcolor="#ccffcc"
| 82
| April 15
| Detroit
| 
| Chris Quinn (26)
| Dorell Wright (10)
| Mario Chalmers (10)
| American Airlines Arena19,600
| 43–39

Playoffs

|- align="center" bgcolor="#ffcccc"
| 1
| April 19
| @ Atlanta
| L 64–90
| Dwyane Wade (19)
| Michael Beasley (10)
| Dwyane Wade (5)
| Philips Arena18,851
| 0–1
|- align="center" bgcolor="#ccffcc"
| 2
| April 22
| @ Atlanta
| W 108–93
| Dwyane Wade (33)
| Udonis Haslem (8)
| Chalmers, Wade (7)
| Philips Arena19,146
| 1–1
|- align="center" bgcolor="#ccffcc"
| 3
| April 25
| Atlanta
| W 107–78
| Dwyane Wade (29)
| Udonis Haslem (13)
| Dwyane Wade (8)
| American Airlines Arena19,600
| 2–1
|- align="center" bgcolor="#ffcccc"
| 4
| April 27
| Atlanta
| L 71–81
| Dwyane Wade (22)
| Udonis Haslem (9)
| Dwyane Wade (7)
| American Airlines Arena19,600
| 2–2
|- align="center" bgcolor="#ffcccc"
| 5
| April 29
| @ Atlanta
| L 91–106
| Dwyane Wade (29)
| Udonis Haslem (8)
| Mario Chalmers (6)
| Philips Arena19,051
| 2–3
|- align="center" bgcolor="#ccffcc"
| 6
| May 1
| Atlanta
| W 98–72
| Dwyane Wade (41)
| Michael Beasley (15)
| Mario Chalmers (7)
| American Airlines Arena19,600
| 3–3
|- align="center" bgcolor="#ffcccc"
| 7
| May 3
| @ Atlanta
| L 78–91
| Dwyane Wade (31)
| Udonis Haslem (13)
| Chalmers, Wade (4)
| Philips Arena18,864
| 3–4
|-

Transactions

Trades
The Heat traded Shawn Marion, Marcus Banks, and cash to the Toronto Raptors for Jermaine O'Neal, Jamario Moon, and a $4 Million trade exception on February 13, 2009.

Free agents

Additions

Subtractions

References

Miami Heat seasons
Miami
Miami Heat
Miami Heat